Sławomir Krawczyk (born 28 May 1963) is a Polish former road cyclist.

Major results

1984
 1st Overall Dookoła Mazowsza
1st Stages 1 & 3
1985
 1st Stage 3 Dookoła Mazowsza
1986
 1st  Road race, National Road Championships 
 1st Overall Dookoła Mazowsza
1st Stage 1
 1st Prologue Tour de Pologne
 2nd Overall Tour du Loir-et-Cher
1987
 4th Overall Tour de Pologne
1988
 1st Prologue Tour de Pologne
1989
 2nd Overall Tour de Pologne
1990
 1st La Côte Picarde
 1st Puchar Ministra Obrony Narodowej
 1st  (with Bertrand Ziegler)
 2nd Paris–Roubaix Amateurs
 2nd Road race, National Road Championships
1991
 1st Paris–Mantes
 1st Overall 
 3rd Grand Prix de la Ville de Lillers

References

External links

1963 births
Living people
Polish male cyclists
People from Trzebiatów